Marcellus Lovejoy Stearns (April 29, 1839 – December 8, 1891) was an American politician who served as the 11th Governor of Florida from 1874 to 1877 during the Reconstruction Era. Originally from Maine, he also served in the Union Army during the American Civil War, losing an arm, and served in Florida's 1868 constitutional convention and in the Florida House of Representatives, including time as speaker.

Born in Lovell in Oxford County in southwestern Maine, he attended Waterville College in Waterville, Maine (which later became Colby College). In 1861, he joined the Union Army and lost an arm during the Battle of Opequon in Winchester, Virginia, after which the Army sent him to study law. He was assigned to Quincy in Gadsden County in the Florida Panhandle, where he remained after his discharge from the military.

Stearns was a member of the Florida Constitutional Convention of 1868 and the Florida House of Representatives from 1868 through 1872, of which he was the Speaker in 1869.  He was elected the fifth Lieutenant Governor of Florida in 1872.

He succeeded to the governorship on March 18, 1874 at age 34 when Governor Ossian B. Hart died of pneumonia. He remains the state's youngest-serving governor. Stearns attempted to force Jonathan Clarkson Gibbs to resign his post as Superintendent of Public Instruction, but was unsuccessful due to Gibbs' immense popularity. After leaving office on January 2, 1877, he was appointed U. S. Commissioner in Hot Springs, Arkansas, a post that he held until 1880. He died in Palatine Bridge, New York, fifty miles from the capital city of Albany. He is interred in the village of Center Lovell, Maine.

After he left office on January 2, 1877, there was no Republican governor of Florida until 1967, when Claude Kirk was inaugurated.

External links 
 Official Governor's portrait and biography from the State of Florida
 

1839 births
1891 deaths
Governors of Florida
Lieutenant Governors of Florida
Speakers of the Florida House of Representatives
Republican Party members of the Florida House of Representatives
Florida lawyers
People of Maine in the American Civil War
People from Lovell, Maine
Republican Party governors of Florida
Colby College alumni
Politicians from Hot Springs, Arkansas
People from Palatine Bridge, New York
Arkansas Republicans
19th-century American politicians
People from Quincy, Florida
Burials in Maine
American amputees
19th-century American lawyers
New York (state) Republicans
Union Army personnel